Garrett–Harrison Stadium is a high school football stadium in Phenix City, Russell County, Alabama, United States, and it has been used for college and high school football games. It is owned by the City of Phenix City and is the home stadium for the football team from Central High School Red Devils. Most famously, the stadium played host to the NCAA Division III Football Championship, also known as the Amos Alonzo Stagg Bowl, from 1973 to 1982 and again from 1985 to 1989. In 2014, Tuskegee and Albany State played a neutral-site game at the stadium called the White Water Classic. It was the first college football game at the stadium since the last Division III championship held at Garrett-Harrison in 1989.

References

External links
Phenix City Garrett-Harrison webpage

College football venues
High school football venues in the United States
American football venues in Alabama